The 1996 United States Senate election in Maine was held November 5, 1996. Incumbent Republican U.S. Senator William Cohen decided to retire instead of seeking a fourth term. To replace him, U.S. Representative Joseph E. Brennan won the Democratic primary while political consultant Susan Collins won the Republican primary. A competitive general election ensued, but Collins ultimately won out over Brennan, keeping the seat in the Republican column.  With Collins' election to the Senate in 1996, Maine became only the second state after California to have two sitting female senators, and the first to have two sitting female Republican senators.

Brennan and Collins both ran in the 1994 gubernatorial election, and each won their respective party's nomination, but lost the general election to independent Angus King, who would be elected in Maine's other Senate seat in 2012 and become a Senator in 2013.

Democratic primary

Candidates
 Joseph E. Brennan, former U.S. Representative from Maine's 1st congressional district and former Governor of Maine
 Jean Hay Bright, activist
 Sean Faircloth, State Senator
 Jerald Leonard
 Richard A. Spencer, former congressional candidate

Results

Republican primary

Candidates
 Susan Collins, former Deputy Treasurer of Maine and nominee for Governor in 1994
 W. John Hathaway, State Senator
 Robert A. G. Monks, nominee for the United States Senate in 1976

Results

General election

Results

See also 
 1996 United States Senate elections

References 

1996 Maine elections
Maine
1996